Alfred Charles White (28 February 1854 – date of death unknown) was an English cricketer. White's batting style is unknown. He was born at Teddington, Middlesex.

White made a single first-class appearance for Surrey against Sussex in 1881 at The Oval. Sussex won the toss and elected to bat, making 95 all out. Surrey responded in their first-innings by making 193 all out, with White ending the innings not out on 9. Sussex then made 136 all out in their second-innings, leaving Surrey with a target of 39 for victory. White opened the batting in Surrey's chase, scoring 6 runs before he was dismissed by Walter Bettesworth. Surrey reached their target with 8 wickets to spare. This was his only major appearance for Surrey.

References

External links
Alfred White at ESPNcricinfo
Alfred White at CricketArchive

1854 births
People from Teddington
English cricketers
Surrey cricketers
Year of death missing